Harpalus australasiae is a species of ground beetle in the subfamily Harpalinae. It was described by Dejean in 1829.

References

australasiae
Beetles described in 1829
Beetles of New Zealand
Beetles of Australia